László Antal  was a Hungarian linguist, structuralist, Doctor of Science (1981), and Professor of Linguistics. He was considered the sole representative of structural linguistics in America in Hungary. He adapted American structuralism to the Hungarian language. He was a lone wolf in Hungarian linguistics.

Life
Antal was born in Szob, Hungary on 25 June, 1930. In 1962, he was awarded a Ford Scholarship to the United States in the academic years of 1964–1965. He was a visiting professor in Berlin between 1981 and 1986. He left Hungary first for Germany then for the United States in 1985 when he was appointed to the head of the General Linguistics Department in ELTE in Budapest. He settled in Manassas, Virginia. He was a professor in the Foreign Service Institute and an advisor at the Jamestown Foundation. He died in  Washington, D.C., of a heart attack, in 1993. He spoke several languages, such as English, German, Russian, French, Albanian, Arabic, and Indonesian, fluently.

References

Selected works
This bibliography contains only the works that were published in English.

Books
Antal, László 1963: Questions of Meaning, Mouton, The Hague.
Antal, László 1964: Content, Meaning, and Understanding, Mouton. The Hague.

Papers
Antal, László 1961: Sign, Meaning, Context, Lingua 10, 211-9.
Antal, László 1963: A new type of dictionary, Linguistics 1, 75-84.

Antal, László 1992: Another calamity of quotas. N.h. [New York], é.n.

1930 births
1993 deaths
People from Szob
People from Manassas, Virginia
Hungarian emigrants to the United States
Linguists from Hungary
Structuralists
Death in Washington, D.C.
20th-century linguists